Vanna Bonta (April 3, 1953 – July 8, 2014) was an Italian-American writer, actress, and inventor. She wrote Flight: A Quantum Fiction Novel. As an actress, Bonta played "Zed's Queen" in The Beastmaster. She performed primarily as a voice talent on a roster of feature films, such as Disney's Beauty and the Beast, as well as on television. Bonta invented the 2suit, a flight garment designed to facilitate sex in microgravity environments of outerspace. The spacesuit was featured on The Universe television series, which followed Bonta into zero gravity to film an episode titled Sex in Space that aired in 2009 on the History Channel.

On 13 November 2013, a haiku by Bonta was one of 1,100 haiku launched from Cape Canaveral on the NASA spacecraft MAVEN to Mars.

Early life and family
Bonta was born in the United States to Maria Luisa Bonta (née Ugolini), an artist from Florence, Italy, and James Cecil Bonta, a military officer from Kentucky. Her mother's elder sister was Italian children's author Lidia Ugolini.

Literary career

In 1995, Bonta's first novel, Flight: A Quantum Fiction Novel was published. Flight has been characterized as "inter-genre" (belonging to more than one genre simultaneously) by the American Library Association, which reviewed it an "auspicious, genre-bending parable". Publishers Weekly described the debut work as running the gamut of particularly moving to quirky and hilarious satire, with "asides about bathtub books, self-doubt tapes and other foibles."

In 2013, a haiku Bonta wrote was one of over 1100 that was launched to Mars on the NASA spacecraft MAVEN. The haiku for the Mars trip were chosen by popular vote from a total 12,530 submissions. Bonta's submission was ranked in the top five.

Inventions

The 2suit

In 2006, Bonta gave talks about an invention she called the 2suit, a flight garment that can be attached to another 2suit to allow two or more people to stay in proximity to one another in low-gravity environments. Although it had several other potential applications, its primary purpose was to enable sex in space. Producers of the History Channel television series The Universe approached Bonta in 2008, offering to manufacture a prototype of the 2suit and send Bonta into zero gravity to test it. She accepted. On the 2suit's segment of the episode, Bonta and her husband demonstrated how the suit works by kissing while installed in it. The documentary concluded that the "2Suit is one small step for humankind colonizing the universe." The 2suit received significant media attention after the episode, titled Sex in Space, aired in 2009.

Lunar Lander Challenge
From 2007-09, she participated in the annual Lunar Lander Challenge, a competition sponsored by NASA and Northrop Grumman to commercially build a lightweight spacecraft for landing on the moon. Bonta was a team member of BonNovA. As creative director, Bonta designed a pressure-release device for high-combustion engines.

References

External links

Recording of lecture in Italian by Prof. Gabriella Fiori about Flight: a quantum fiction novel, 1996 

1958 births
2014 deaths
Place of birth missing
Place of death missing
20th-century American novelists
21st-century American novelists
21st-century American poets
American voice actresses
American poets of Italian descent
American women novelists
Women inventors
20th-century American poets
20th-century American women writers
21st-century American women writers